The canton of Val de Nouère is an administrative division of the Charente department, southwestern France. It was created at the French canton reorganisation which came into effect in March 2015. Its seat is in Linars.

It consists of the following communes:
 
Asnières-sur-Nouère
Champmillon
Courbillac
Douzat
Échallat
Genac-Bignac
Hiersac
Linars
Marcillac-Lanville
Mareuil
Marsac
Mons
Moulidars
Rouillac
Saint-Amant-de-Nouère
Saint-Cybardeaux
Saint-Genis-d'Hiersac
Saint-Saturnin
Sireuil
Trois-Palis
Val-d'Auge
Vaux-Rouillac
Vindelle

References

Cantons of Charente